//Khara Hais Local Municipality was a local municipality in the Northern Cape province of South Africa. The unusual spelling of the name comes from the original transcription of the Khwe language name, where the click consonant became "//".

After municipal elections on 3 August 2016 it was merged with the Mier Local Municipality to form the Dawid Kruiper Local Municipality.

Geography
The municipality area covered  and stretched from the Orange River valley northwards to the international border with Botswana. Irrigation from the Orange River has produced a narrow band of irrigated land along the valley, while the rest of the municipality is desert, being the southernmost extent of the Kalahari. The Molopo and Kuruman Rivers flow intermittently through this desert area.

According to the 2011 census the municipality had a population of 93,494 people in 23,245 households. 65.2% of these people describe themselves as "Coloured", 23.1% as "Black African", and 9.9% as "White". 86.5% of the population speaks Afrikaans as their first language, 5.1% speak Xhosa, 3.6% speak Tswana and 1.9% speak English.

Most of the residents of the municipality live in the town of Upington, which has a population of 74,834. There are several smaller agricultural villages in the Orange River valley; they include (from east to west) Lamprechtsdrif (pop. 817), Karos (pop. 1,249), Leerkrans (pop. 1,383), Straussburg (pop. 1,157), Swartkop (pop. 1,652), Louisvale (pop. 4,435) and Klippunt (pop. 3,473).

Politics 
The municipal council consisted of twenty-seven members elected by mixed-member proportional representation. Fourteen councillors were elected by first-past-the-post voting in fourteen wards, while the remaining thirteen were chosen from party lists so that the total number of party representatives was proportional to the number of votes received. In the election of 18 May 2011 the African National Congress (ANC) won a majority of sixteen seats on the council.
The following table shows the results of the election.

Wine industry 
Most of Upington's wines are produced by Orange River Wine Cellars (OWC). The company has six depots in the area (all of them on the banks of the Orange River) at Upington, Kanoneiland, Grootdrink, Kakamas, Keimoes and Groblershoop. The wines from OWC are exported, inter alia, to Europe and the USA. A number of privately owned cellars also exist in the area. The //Khara Hais region accounts for more or less 40% of South Africa's grape exports.

References

External links
 Official website

2016 disestablishments in South Africa
Former local municipalities of South Africa
Populated places disestablished in 2016
Dawid Kruiper Local Municipality